Jacob Michael Burger (born April 10, 1996) is an American professional baseball third baseman for the Chicago White Sox of Major League Baseball (MLB). He made his MLB debut in 2021.

Career

Amateur career
Burger attended Christian Brothers College High School in St. Louis, Missouri. He was not drafted out of high school and played college baseball at Missouri State University for the Missouri State Bears. As a freshman, he played in 57 games, hitting .342/.390/.518 with four home runs and 42 runs batted in (RBIs) and was named the Missouri Valley Conference Freshman of the Year. As a sophomore in 2016, Burger hit .349/.420/.689 with 21 home runs and 72 RBIs over 56 games. After the season, he played for the United States collegiate national team. As a junior in 2017, he batted .328 with 22 home runs and 65 RBIs and was named the Missouri Valley Conference Player of the Year.

Professional career
Burger was considered one of the top prospects for the 2017 Major League Baseball draft. He was drafted by the Chicago White Sox in the first round with the 11th overall selection, signed, and was assigned to the Arizona League White Sox. He was promoted to the Kannapolis Intimidators after four games. He finished 2017 with a .263 batting average, five home runs, and 29 RBIs in 51 games between both clubs.

Burger was invited to 2018 spring training by the White Sox. On February 26, he suffered a ruptured achilles tendon in his left leg, and was ruled out for the entire 2018 season on February 27. In 2019, he missed time during the season due to a bruised heel.

In 2020, Burger participated in the CarShield Collegiate league, a collegiate summer league in O'Fallon, Missouri, because there was no minor league season due to the COVID-19 pandemic. It was his first time playing competitive baseball since 2017. When the summer league ended, Burger was invited to the White Sox alternate training site.

On November 20, 2020, Burger was added to the 40-man roster. He was assigned to Triple-A Charlotte Knights to begin the 2021 season. Following a season-ending injury to Nick Madrigal, Burger began taking reps at second base in Charlotte. In June 2021, Burger was selected to play in the All-Star Futures Game. On July 2, after hitting .322 in Charlotte, Burger was promoted to the major leagues for the first time. He made his MLB debut that day as the starting third baseman against the Detroit Tigers. In the game, he also notched his first career hit, a double off of Tigers reliever Erasmo Ramírez. On July 17, Burger hit his first career home run, a two-run shot off of Houston Astros pitcher Austin Pruitt.

In 2022, Burger was added to the White Sox's opening day roster and played third base for Yoán Moncada who was injured. Burger played in 21 games with a .239 average hitting 2 home runs and 7 RBI's before he was sent back to Triple-A on May 9 when Moncada was activated.

References

External links

Missouri State Bears bio

1996 births
Living people
Baseball players from St. Louis
All-American college baseball players
Major League Baseball third basemen
Chicago White Sox players
Missouri State Bears baseball players
Arizona League White Sox players
Kannapolis Intimidators players
Charlotte Knights players